Stubbs is an unincorporated community in Barber County, Kansas, United States.

References

Further reading

External links
 Barber County maps: Current, Historic, KDOT

Unincorporated communities in Barber County, Kansas
Unincorporated communities in Kansas